Chenango Lake is a lake located by Chenango Lake, New York. Fish species present in the lake include pumpkinseed sunfish, and tiger muskie. There is access via boat launch on the southwest corner of the lake.

References

Lakes of New York (state)
Lakes of Chenango County, New York